Payam Bouyeri (born January 12, 1994, in Izeh) is an Iranian wrestler.
He won a bronze medal at the 2014 Asian Games.

References

Living people
1994 births
Asian Games bronze medalists for Iran
Wrestlers at the 2014 Asian Games
Asian Games medalists in wrestling
Iranian male sport wrestlers
Medalists at the 2014 Asian Games
People from Izeh
Sportspeople from Khuzestan province
21st-century Iranian people